The Socialist Workers' Party (in French: Parti Socialiste des Travailleurs) is a political party in Algeria. Its views are similar to those of the reunified Fourth International. PST was founded in 1989 by the Revolutionary Communist Group (GCR).

The PST publishes El Khatwa. In the 17 May 2007 People's National Assembly elections, the party won 0.75% of the vote and no seats of 389 seats.

References

External links
Official web site

1989 establishments in Algeria
Communist parties in Algeria
Fourth International (post-reunification)
Political parties established in 1989
Political parties in Algeria